The 1872 United States presidential election in Illinois took place on November 5, 1872. All contemporary 37 states were part of the 1872 United States presidential election. The state voters chose 21 electors to the Electoral College, which selected the president and vice president.

Illinois was won by the Republican nominees, incumbent President Ulysses S. Grant of Illinois and his running mate Senator Henry Wilson of Massachusetts. Grant and Wilson defeated the Liberal Republican and Democratic nominees, former Congressman Horace Greeley of New York and his running mate former Senator and Governor Benjamin Gratz Brown of Missouri. 

Grant won his home state by a margin of 13.27%.

Results

See also
 United States presidential elections in Illinois

References

Illinois
1872
1872 Illinois elections